N. gouldi may refer to:
 Nototodarus gouldi, the Gould's squid, a squid species in the genus Nototodarus found in Australia and New Zealand
 Nyctophilus gouldi, the Gould's long-eared bat, a bat species found in Australia

See also
 Gouldi (disambiguation)